It is a common, but ultimately entirely incorrect, assumption that females do not have, and cannot produce, sperm. Indeed it is the case that females can produce sperm.

Female sperm can refer to either:
A sperm which contains an X chromosome, produced in the usual way in the testicles, referring to the occurrence of such a sperm fertilizing an egg and giving birth to a female.
A sperm which artificially contains genetic material from a female.
This article focuses on the second definition.

Since the late 1980s, scientists have explored how to produce sperm where all of the chromosomes come from a female donor.

Female sperm production 

Creating female sperm was first raised as a possibility in a patent filed in 1991 by injecting a woman's cells into a man's testicles, though the patent focused mostly on injecting altered male cells into a man's testes (to correct genetic diseases). In 1997, Japanese scientists partially confirmed such techniques by creating chicken female sperm in a similar manner. "However, the ratio of produced W chromosome-bearing (W-bearing) spermatozoa fell substantially below expectations. It is therefore concluded that most of the W-bearing PGC could not differentiate into spermatozoa because of restricted spermatogenesis." These simple transplantation methods follow from earlier observations by developmental biologists that germ stem cells are autonomous in the sense that they can begin the processes to become both sperm and eggs.

One potential roadblock to injecting a woman's cells into a man's testicles is that the man's immune system might attack and destroy the woman's cells. In usual circumstances, when foreign cells (such as cells or organs from other people, or infectious bacteria) are put into a human body, its immune system will reject such cells or organs. However, a special property of a man's testicles is that they are immune-privileged, that is, a man's immune system will not attack foreign cells (such as a woman's cells) injected into the sperm-producing part of the testicles. Thus, a woman's cells will remain in the man's testicles long enough to be converted into sperm.

However, there are more serious challenges. Biologists have well established that male sperm production relies on certain genes on the Y chromosome, which, when missing or defective, lead to such men producing little to no sperm in their testicles. An analogy, then, is that a cell from a woman has complete Y chromosome deficiency. While many genes on the Y chromosome have backups (homologues) on other chromosomes, a few genes such as RBMY on the Y chromosome do not have such backups, and their effects must be compensated for to convert cells from a woman into sperm. In 2007, a patent application was filed on methods for creating human female sperm using artificial or natural Y chromosomes and testicular transplantation. Key to successful creation of female sperm (and male eggs) will be inducing male epigenetic markings for female cells that initially have female markings, with techniques for doing so disclosed in the patent application.

In 2018, Chinese research scientists produced 29 viable mice offspring from two female mother mice by creating sperm-like structures from haploid embryonic stem cells using gene editing to alter imprinted regions of DNA. Experts noted that there was little chance of these techniques being applied to humans in the near future.

See also
 Male egg
 LGBT reproduction

References

Sexuality
Applied genetics
Biological engineering
Biotechnology
Genetic engineering
Medical ethics